Lisa Shepperson (born September 1, 1975) is a Republican member of the Wyoming House of Representatives, representing the 58th district since 2007. Her district covers northern Casper, Wyoming. She is a member of the House Judiciary Committee.

Shepperson was elected in November 2006, 61%-39%, and considers herself a conservative.

External links

Wyoming State Legislature - Representative Lisa Shepperson official WY Senate website
Project Vote Smart - Representative Lisa Shepperson (WY) profile
Follow the Money - Lisa Shepperson
2006 campaign contributions

1975 births
Living people
Members of the Wyoming House of Representatives
Politicians from Casper, Wyoming
University of Wyoming alumni
Women state legislators in Wyoming
21st-century American women